Oppes is a surname. Notable people with the surname include:

Antonio Oppes (1916–2002), Italian horse rider
Salvatore Oppes (1909–1987), Italian horse rider, brother of Antonio

See also
Oppe